The following highways are numbered 820:

United States